Crafar is a surname. Notable people with the surname include:

Carl Crafar (born 1964), New Zealand cricketer
Simon Crafar (born 1969), Grand Prix motorcycle road racer from New Zealand

See also
Crafar Farms, dairy business in New Zealand